Mägi is a surname of Estonian origin. The word "mägi" in Estonian means "mountain" or "hill". People with the surname Mägi include:

Anne Mägi (born 1960), Estonian track and field athlete and coach
Artur Mägi (1904–1981) Estonian legal scientist
Arvi Mägi (born 1949), Estonian actor and theatre director
Ester Mägi (1922–2021), Estonian composer 
Harald Mägi (born 1932), Estonian politician
Konrad Mägi (1878–1925), Estonian landscape painter
Laine Mägi (born 1959), Estonian actress and dancer
Leino Mägi (born 1955), Estonian politician
Marin Mägi (born 1982), Estonian actress
Maris Mägi (born 1987), Estonian sprinter
Paul Mägi (born 1953), Estonian conductor
Taivo Mägi (born 1960), Estonian track and field athlete and coach
Rasmus Mägi (born 1992), Estonian hurdler 
Tõnis Mägi (born 1948), Estonian singer, guitarist, composer and actor
Voldemar Mägi (1914–1954), Estonian wrestler

See also
Magi (disambiguation)
Mäki, a Finnish word and surname meaning "hill"

Estonian-language surnames